Nemanja Ilić (born 11 May 1990) is a Serbian handball player for Fenix Toulouse and the Serbia national team.

Club career
After coming through the youth categories of Partizan, Ilić spent two seasons on loan with Radnički Kragujevac. He returned to his parent club in 2010 and helped the team win two consecutive national championships (2011 and 2012). In 2013, Ilić moved abroad and signed with French side Fenix Toulouse. He was loaned to Barcelona in early 2019, replacing the injured Casper Ulrich Mortensen until the end of the season.

International career
A Serbia international since 2012, Ilić participated in two World Championships (2013 and 2019) and three European Championships (2014, 2018 and 2020).

Personal life
Ilić is the older brother of fellow handball player Vanja Ilić.

Honours
Partizan
 Serbian Handball Super League: 2010–11, 2011–12
 Serbian Handball Cup: 2011–12, 2012–13
 Serbian Handball Super Cup: 2011, 2012
Barcelona
 Liga ASOBAL: 2018–19

References

External links

 LNH record
 

1990 births
Living people
Handball players from Belgrade
Serbian male handball players
RK Partizan players
FC Barcelona Handbol players
Liga ASOBAL players
Expatriate handball players
Serbian expatriate sportspeople in France
Serbian expatriate sportspeople in Spain